Theonesios II of Characene was a 1st century king of  the kingdom of Characene located at the mouth of the Tigris-Euphrates rivers during antiquity. He ruled for only a few months in 46/47AD. His rule is known only by the coins he minted.

He was succeeded by Theonesios III.

References

Year of birth missing
Year of death missing
1st-century deaths
1st-century monarchs in the Middle East
Kings of Characene